El Argar is an Early Bronze Age culture that was based in Antas, Almería, within modern Spain. It is believed to have been active from about 2200 B.C. to 1500 B.C. The people developed sophisticated pottery and ceramic techniques that they traded with other Mediterranean tribes.

The civilization of El Argar extended to all the province of Almería, north onto the central Meseta, to most of the region of Murcia and westward into the provinces of Granada and Jaen, controlling an area similar in size to modern Belgium.

Its cultural and possibly political influence was much wider. Its influence has been found in eastern and southwestern Iberia (Algarve), and it likely affected other regions as well.

Some authors have suggested that El Argar was a unified state.

Material culture

El Argar is the cultural center of the Early and Middle Bronze Age in Iberia. Metallurgy of bronze and pseudo-bronze (alloyed with arsenic instead of tin) was practiced. Weapons are the main metallurgic product: knives, halberds, swords, spear and arrow points, and big axes with curved edges are all abundant, not just in the Argaric area, but also elsewhere in Iberia.

Silver was also exploited. Gold had been abundantly used in the Chalcolithic period, but it became less common in El Argar culture. Discovery in 2014 of an especially rich grave and an associated building at La Almoloya have provided important details about the culture. The archaeological site is in a southeastern portion of the Iberian Peninsula. The richness of the burials of its women has led to some re-evaluation of the place of women in this Early Bronze Age culture.

The women at this site were buried with numerous grave goods of silver, treasure that suggests that women held high status in the society. For instance, excavation of Grave 38 began in 2014, and it contains burial goods estimated to be worth tens of thousands of dollars and included a diadem. The burial was found below a unique building, when compared to the others excavated. The building above the grave appears to be a great hall, with benches along the sides that could seat up to 60 people. This suggests that the hall was used for politics. The grave and hall have been radiocarbon dated to approximately 1700 BC.

Periodization

The culture of El Argar has traditionally been divided in two phases, named A and B.

El Argar A 
Phase A started in the eighteenth century BC, with the earliest calibrated C-14 dates pointing to the first half of that century: 
 1730 BC (+/- 70 years) in Fuente Álamo for El Argar A2, with six undated A1 layers under it

El Argar B 
Phase B begins in the sixteenth century BC. The main C-14 date is that of 1550 BC (+/- 70 years) in Fuente Álamo for the upper layer of El Argar B2 (with four layers underneath the lowest B phase). Other stratigraphic dates are somewhat more recent, but are not confirmed by C-14.

Post-Argarian phase 
El Argar B ends in the fourteenth or thirteenth century BC, giving way to a less homogeneous post-Argarian culture. Again, Fuente Álamo gives the best C-14 dating with 1330 BC (+/- 70 years).

Recent trends
Many more C-14 dates have been published since the beginning of the twenty-first century. In recent publications, at least 260 such dates are cited altogether. There is now a widespread consensus that the emergence of El Argar can be dated at 2200 cal BC, although its end remains somewhat disputed. Various opinions place the end of El Argar at fifteenth-fourteenth centuries BC.

Gallery

References

Bibliography

External links
 
 

Prehistoric sites in Spain
Archaeological sites in Andalusia
Bronze Age Spain
Algarve
Ancient pottery
Almería
Murcian culture